Father Vojtech is a 1936 Czech drama film directed by Martin Frič.

Cast
 Rolf Wanka as Vojtěch Dvorecký
 Ladislav H. Struna as Karel
 Jaroslav Marvan as Dvorecký, mlynár
 Jiřina Štěpničková as Frantina
 Ella Nollová as Jozífkova matka
 Theodor Pištěk as Petr, stárek
 Josef Příhoda as Mikuska
 Václav Trégl as Maøánek, policajt
 František Smolík as Rektor semináře
 Rudolf Deyl as Biskup
 František Kreuzmann as Václav Novotný, tulák
 Alois Dvorský as Starosta
 Frantisek Hlavatý as Farár Janu
 Milada Gampeová as Pepička

References

External links
 

1936 films
1936 drama films
1930s Czech-language films
Czechoslovak black-and-white films
Films directed by Martin Frič
Czechoslovak drama films
1930s Czech films